Antonio Cedrés Cabrera (28 October 1927 – 14 October 2015) was a Spanish professional football player and coach.

Playing career
He played for Real Club Victoria, Telde, Las Palmas and Real Betis, before retiring at the age of 24 due to injury.

Coaching career
He later managed El Carmen, Isleta and Rosiana.

Personal life
His brothers Juan, Domingo and Feluco were also footballers.

References

1927 births
2015 deaths
Spanish footballers
UD Las Palmas players
Real Betis players
Spanish football managers
Association footballers not categorized by position